Rest in Peace: The Final Concert is a  live album by English gothic rock band Bauhaus of a concert performed in 1983 at the Hammersmith Palais in London.

The first disc is the concert and the second disc is the encore.

Track listing

Personnel 

 Peter Murphy – vocals, guitar
 Daniel Ash – guitar
 David J – bass guitar
 Kevin Haskins – drums

References

External links 

 

Bauhaus (band) albums
1992 live albums